August Gebert was born in Mecklenburg, Germany and was a joiner by profession.  He became a member of the Communist League while living in Switzerland.  He continued to participate in the Communist League when he moved to London in 1850.  There he became a part of the sectarian Willich-Schapper group within the Communist League, which is known for expelling Marx and Engels.  In London he was the chair of the CABV (German Communist Workers' Educational Union) Whitechapel branch.

References

German revolutionaries
German socialists